Glušci is a village in the town of Metković, Croatia. According to the 2011 census, the village had 76 inhabitants.

Demographic history

References 

Metković
Populated places in Dubrovnik-Neretva County
Serb communities in Croatia